Nepenthes rosea is a tropical pitcher plant known only from Krabi Province, Peninsular Thailand, where it grows at 450–520 m above sea level. It is unusual in that it sometimes produces a rosette along the peduncle.

References

External links

Carnivorous plants of Asia
rosea
Endemic flora of Thailand
Plants described in 2014